José López Calo (4 February 1922 – 10 May 2020) was a Spanish musicologist.

Biography
After studying music alongside Manuel Ansola at the Monastery of San Martiño Pinario, he subsequently earned a degree in philosophy at Comillas Pontifical University in 1949. He was ordained a priest in 1951 and graduated from the Faculty of Theology of Granada with a degree in theology in 1956.

Awards
Medalla de Oro al mérito en las Bellas Artes (1998)
Premio das Letras e Artes de Galicia (2002)
Premio Fernández-Latorre (2008)

Works
La música medieval en Galicia (1982)
Las sonatas de Beethoven para piano (1986)
La música en la Catedral de Santiago (1993)
La música en la Catedral de Plasencia (1995)
La música en la catedral de Burgos (1995)
Historia de la música española (2004)
Documentario musical de la Capilla Real de Granada (2005)
La música en las catedrales españolas (2012)
El miserere de Semana Santa en la Catedral de Sevilla (2015)

References

External links

1922 births
2020 deaths
Spanish musicologists
Spanish Roman Catholic priests
Comillas Pontifical University alumni